Mahipal Lomror (born 16 November 1999) is an Indian cricketer who plays for Rajasthan in domestic cricket and Royal Challengers Bangalore in Indian Premier League. He is an all-rounder who bats left-handed and bowls slow left-arm orthodox.

Career
Mahipal made his first-class debut for Rajasthan in the 2016–17 Ranji Trophy on 6 October 2016. Prior to his debut, he was named in India's squad for the 2016 Under-19 Cricket World Cup. He made his Twenty20 debut for Rajasthan in the 2016–17 Inter State Twenty-20 Tournament on 30 January 2017. He made his List A debut for Rajasthan in the 2016–17 Vijay Hazare Trophy on 25 February 2017.

He was the joint-leading wicket-taker for Rajasthan in the 2017–18 Ranji Trophy, with 13 dismissals in six matches.

In January 2018, he was bought by the Rajasthan Royals in the 2018 IPL auction. In August 2019, he was named in the India Red team's squad for the 2019–20 Duleep Trophy.

In February 2022, he was bought by the Royal Challengers Bangalore in the auction for the 2022 Indian Premier League tournament.

Mahipal Lomror IPL 2023 
Since the last couple of seasons, Mahipal Lomror has been a reliable batsman at the end of the Rajasthan Royals' lineup. His recent performances in the domestic circuit, which included horses like 69, 55, 46, 85, and 101, have also been pretty hot, which got a lot of people interested when his name came up at the auction table.

The Challengers had to dig deep to land the youngster but they were persistent enough to bring him to the table. He was bought by the Royal Challengers Bangalore for Rs 95 lakh.

Mahipal Lomror Net Worth 
As per his previous IPL appearance and biding price IPL 2023. As a player for the Rajasthan cricket team, he has gained recognition for his skills as a left-handed batsman and slow left-arm orthodox bowler. According to publicly available information, his estimated net worth is 1.16 crore ($296K). However, it's worth noting that this information is subject to change and may not be up-to-date.

Mahipal Lomror Education 
Mahipal Lomror attended the MDSU College Ajmer where he graduated with a degree.

References

External links
 

1999 births
Living people
Indian cricketers
Rajasthan cricketers
Rajasthan Royals cricketers
Royal Challengers Bangalore cricketers
People from Nagaur